Key Energy Services is an American oilfield services company.

Background
The company, established in 1977, provides well services and is based in Houston, Texas with other offices in Midland, Texas and regional offices in Bakersfield, California; Farmington, New Mexico; Casper, Wyoming; El Reno, Oklahoma; Fort Lupton and Grand Junction, Colorado; Lafayette and Shreveport, Louisiana; and Arnoldsburg, West Virginia.  Key has over 175 service locations (known as “districts”) in the US. Globally, Key Energy Services has operations in the Middle East, Russia, Mexico, Colombia and Ecuador.

Business Segments 
Service offerings include:

Rig Services
Rig-based well-servicing for workover or re-entries on existing wells, such as: 
 New well completions
 PNA (Plug and Abandonment)
 Stimulation of existing wells with declining production
 Horizontal or directional drilling
 SmartTongsm Rod Connection Service

Fluid Management Services
Oilfield transportation services (often referred to as “Trucking”)

Fishing Services
Process to recover lost or stuck equipment in the well bore utilizing a "fishing tool” or “jar”.  The FRS operations also cut windows in well sidewall casings for horizontal re-entries.

Rental Services
Ancillary equipment such as generators, drill collars as well as proprietary tools such as the Hydra-Walkr automated pipe handling system.

Coiled Tubing Services (CTS)
Provides fracing aka Hydraulic fracturing, acidizing and cementing services.

History and notable acquisitions 
While Key Energy traces its roots to New Hope, Pennsylvania, operating under the name The Yankee Companies, the company's current name is a legacy of Yale E. Key, a West Texas oilman from Midland, Texas, who started his oilwell service business in the 1940s. After his death in the 1980s, his company, Yale E. Key, Inc., was sold to the Yankee Companies. As a result of the continued acquisition of oilwell service companies, the Yankee Companies changed its name to Key Energy in the 1990s. Key Energy has grown through over 1002 acquisitions. The most notable ones are listed below.

See also 
 List of oilfield service companies

External links 
Key Energy Services
 http://www.rigzone.com/news/article.asp?a_id=50445
http://www.allbusiness.com/banking-finance/financial-markets-investing/8907145-1.html

References 

Companies listed on the New York Stock Exchange
Oilfield services companies
Companies based in Houston